Oligoxyloglucan beta-glycosidase (isoprimeverose-producing oligoxyloglucan hydrolase, oligoxyloglucan hydrolase) is an enzyme with systematic name oligoxyloglucan xyloglucohydrolase. This enzyme catalyses the following chemical reaction

 Hydrolysis of (1->4)-beta-D-glucosidic links in oligoxyloglucans so as to remove successive isoprimeverose [i.e. alpha-xylo-(1->6)-beta-D-glucosyl-] residues from the non-reducing chain ends

References

External links 
 

EC 3.2.1